John "Johnny" Kerningham Sidney Scott (ca. 1938; Buffalo, New York – April 20, 2010) was an American jazz vocalist and tenor saxophonist.

Early life 
Scott was born in Buffalo, New York, and began his musical studies at the age of 15.

Career 
After enlisting in the United States Army, he joined a band which entertained American troops in Europe. Subsequent to his discharge from the Army in the early-1960s, Scott moved to Montreal, Quebec, Canada, where he performed in a wide spectrum of settings for over 47 years.

Scott explored a variety of other genres over the course of his career, including pop music, R&B, and blues.

Personal life 
Scott died of cancer in Saint-Jean-sur-Richelieu, Québec, Canada, on April 20, 2010. He was 72 years old.

Discography
"Never Let Me Go" (With the Josh Rager sextet Time and Again Effendi records 2008)
Easy Living (with the Geoff Lapp Trio) - Victor Studio / PJ Studio, 2003
Contrasts (Geoff Lapp, pno; George Mitchell, bs; David Laing, dms) - JazzCo, 1990
From Now On - JazzCo, 1986

References

1930s births
2010 deaths
Canadian jazz singers
Canadian jazz saxophonists
Male saxophonists
20th-century Canadian male singers
20th-century saxophonists
20th-century Canadian male musicians
Canadian male jazz musicians